Artem Volovich (born 15 March 1999) is a Belarusian professional footballer who plays for Osipovichi.

References

External links 
 
 

1999 births
Living people
Belarusian footballers
Association football midfielders
FC BATE Borisov players
FC Krumkachy Minsk players
FC Gorodeya players
FC Osipovichi players